Nikolai Sergeyevich Kalaychev (December 16, 1956, Kaluga) is a Soviet football player. The elder brother of Andrey Kalaychev.

Career
The first coach is Yuri Kruglov (Kaluga). In 1973 he made his first team debut at FC Lokomotiv Kaluga.

In 1975, he moved to Lokomotiv Moscow, where he became a solid player in the main team the following year. Appeared in Soviet Top League.

He ended his playing career in 1985.

In 1992, at the invitation of the coach Yevgeny Goryansky, he spent some time at the FC Oka.

He played for the   USSR youth team.

References

External links
 

1956 births
Living people
Soviet footballers
Russian footballers
Soviet Union youth international footballers
Sportspeople from Kaluga
FC Lokomotiv Moscow players
Soviet Top League players
FC Lokomotiv Kaluga players
Association football defenders